San Gregorio may refer to:

People
Santos Gregorio - (Saint Gregory of Nazianzus) (c.330-c.390)
San Gregorio Magno, Saint Gregory the Great - Pope Gregory I (c.540-604)
 San Gregorio Magno al Celio a church in Rome dedicated to Gregory

Places
Italy
San Gregorio, Assisi, Umbria
San Gregorio, L'Aquila, Abruzzo
San Gregorio da Sassola, Lazio
San Gregorio di Catania, Sicily
San Gregorio d'Ippona, Calabria
San Gregorio Matese, Campania
San Gregorio nelle Alpi, Veneto

United States
San Gregorio, California, in San Mateo County
San Gregorio Fault, an offshore component of the San Andreas system of faults
San Gregorio nude beach
San Gregorio State Beach
San Gregorio Creek
San Gregorio Reservoir, Rio Arriba County, New Mexico

Elsewhere
Arenales de San Gregorio, Ciudad Real, Spain
San Gregorio, Entre Ríos, Argentina
San Gregorio, Santa Fe, Argentina
San Gregorio, Chile, Magallanes, Chile
San Gregorio Atzompa, Puebla, Mexico
San Gregorio Cautzingo, Mexico
San Gregorio de Nigua, Dominican Republic
San Gregorio de Polanco, Tacuarembó Department, Uruguay
San Gregorio, Uruguay, Rocha Department, Uruguay

Other
A.S.D. Club Calcio San Gregorio, Italian football club